This is a list of broadcast television stations serving cities in the Canadian province of Ontario. Note: Due to the mandatory digital television transition on August 31, 2011, most of these stations are broadcasting in digital only.

Defunct stations
Channel 4: CHNB-TV - CBC - North Bay
Channel 5: CJIC-TV - CBC - Sault Ste. Marie
Channel 9: CKNC-TV - CBC - Sudbury
Channel 6: CFCL-TV - CBC - Timmins
Channel 8: CJSS-TV - CBC - Cornwall (1959-1963; later became rebroadcaster of CJOH-TV in Ottawa)
Channel 19: CKXT-DT-2 - Sun News Network - London (rebroadcaster of CKXT-TV Toronto)
Channel 20: CKXT-DT-3 - Sun News Network - Ottawa (rebroadcaster of CKXT-TV Toronto)
Channel 20: CBLN-TV-5 - CBC - Wiarton (rebroadcaster of CBLT Toronto)
Channel 23: CBLN - CBC - London (rebroadcaster of CBLT Toronto)
Channel 29: CBLN-TV-1 - CBC - Kitchener (rebroadcaster of CBLT Toronto)
Channel 34: CBLN-TV-2 - CBC - Oil Springs/Sarnia (rebroadcaster of CBLT Toronto)
Channel 35: CBEFT - SRC - Windsor (rebroadcaster of CBLFT Toronto)
Channel 44: CBLN-TV-6 - CBC - Normandale (rebroadcaster of CBLT Toronto)
Channel 45: CKXT-DT-1 - Sun News Network - Hamilton (rebroadcaster of CKXT-TV Toronto)
Channel 45: CBLN-TV-4 - CBC - Wingham (rebroadcaster of CBLT Toronto)
Channel 52: CKXT-DT - Sun News Network - Toronto
Channel 55: CBLN-TV-3 - CBC - Chatham (rebroadcaster of CBLT Toronto)

See also
List of television stations in Canada
Media in Canada

References

Ontario

Television stations